PlateSpin is a software suite of Micro Focus International.  Originally a standalone software company headquartered in Toronto, Canada, registered in Delaware, US as Platespin Inc. and founded by Robert Reive in 1999 with co-founders added later David Richards, Bruno Baloi and M. Verdun. Intel corp. via the Intel64fund was a key investor, along with 4Quarters Capital, Castlehill Ventures(Barry Laver) and AltaMira, the latter three all of Toronto, Canada. The original product for which the patent was filed was the Platespin Operations Center, the first usable VM provisioning tool for low cost deployment of  servers in their VMs to Vmware ESX and GSX on 64bit processors. Platespin Operations Centre was designed to reduce operations cost and more efficiently use the resources of large servers, as well as deal with routine security patches to software servers and their OS efficiently.  Today Platespin is a NetIQ suite of software that helps manage physical and virtualized server workloads on VMware, Microsoft Hyper-V, KVM, Citrix XenServer, Amazon Web Services and Microsoft Azure.

History 

After the 9/11 financial meltdown, PlateSpin's immediate market opportunity shrank rapidly, as most large early customer Opportunity IT budgets were frozen, and as a result the team was disbanded by their major interests in Feb, 2003 and placed in receivership.  The first company did win some awards such as a 2003 award from Giga Research as "Most promising new technology in a new category: Software Server Provisioning".

Later re-formed by Stephen Pollack in March, 2003 from a Receivership as an Ontario, Canada ltd. numbered company with the same PlateSpin name.  A few key members of the original software development, packaging and business development team were rehired to refocus previously created PlateSpin's product line value on a narrower market focus, the converting of physical servers to virtual servers for VMware under the PowerP2V and later the PowerConvert label.

The new PlateSpin created two additional products -- PlateSpin PowerRecon to statistically analyze the data center to help prepare for consolidation and PlateSpin Forge, a disaster recovery solution. The re-worked company rapidly grow from $0 to $25M in five years through PlateSpin's reseller/integrator channel networks.

Over the 5 years of the new PlateSpin, the company reached the milestone of over 10,000 customers worldwide and had reached global headcount of about 225 employees. 

On February 25, 2008, Novell announced that it had entered into a definitive agreement to acquire PlateSpin Ltd. for 205 million USD.  On March 31, 2008, Novell announced that it had completed the acquisition of PlateSpin, which would "become part of the Novell Systems and Resource Management business unit and continue to develop and market its solutions to a global customer base."

On May 18, 2011, Attachmate announced that they had transferred the PlateSpin products from their Novell business unit to their NetIQ business unit.

In November of 2014, Attachmate completed a merger with Micro Focus International (LON: MCRO), a global enterprise infrastructure software company headquartered in Newbury, United Kingdom.  As part of its continued operations streamlining, Micro Focus closed the Toronto, Canada office of PlateSpin and moved all remaining North American operations to the United States.

Products
PlateSpin solutions manage physical and virtualized server workloads on VMware, Microsoft Hyper-V, KVM or Citrix XenServer.

PlateSpin Recon (formerly PowerRecon) enables system administrators to inventory their physical and virtual servers, and catalog resources like CPU type, amount of RAM, disk storage, etc. PlateSpin Recon can also monitor the utilization of these resources over time, and create "profiles" that can be used to facilitate server consolidation initiatives.
Support has ended

PlateSpin Migrate (formerly PowerConvert) allows system administrators to migrate workloads between physical and virtual servers in order to match workload to the machine best suited for the job. Support will be discontinued end of September 2021

PlateSpin Protect (formerly PowerConvert) allows system administrators to protect physical and virtual workloads by creating and maintaining virtual machine copies for disaster recovery and business continuity purposes. Discontinued - Support ended August 2019

PlateSpin Forge is a hardware appliance that allows system administrators to protect physical and virtual workloads by leveraging embedded virtualization. PlateSpin Forge includes all of the software, hardware, and storage needed to deploy a simple disaster recovery solution. Discontinued - Support ended August 2019

PlateSpin Transformation Manager helps enterprises, service providers, and systems integrators plan and track large-scale data center transformation projects across physical, virtual, and cloud infrastructures. Support will be discontinued end of June 2022

References

External links 
 NetIQ's website
 Micro Focus' website
  Micro Focus Product Lifecycle

Companies established in 2003
Virtualization software